Vladislav Gennadyevich Yuzhakov (born 25 January 1986) is a Russian luger who has competed since 1995. His best Luge World Cup finish was 15th in men's doubles in 2007–08.

Yuzhakov qualified for the 2010 Winter Olympics where he finished tenth.

He participated at the 2019 FIL World Luge Championships, winning a medal.

References

External links
 
 

lugers]]

1986 births
Living people
Russian male lugers
Olympic lugers of Russia
Lugers at the 2010 Winter Olympics
Lugers at the 2014 Winter Olympics
People from Chusovoy
Sportspeople from Perm Krai